Republic Day is the name of a holiday in several countries to commemorate the day when they became republics.

List

January

1 January in Slovak Republic
The day of creation of Slovak republic. A national holiday since 1993. Officially called The day of establishment of Slovak republic.

9 January in Republika Srpska (Bosnia and Herzegovina)

After Yugoslavia fell apart, Serbs in Bosnia and Herzegovina wanted to stay with Serbia and Montenegro. Croats and Bosniaks, on the other hand, wanted to create an independent state of Bosnia and Herzegovina. On 9 January 1992, Bosnian Serb authorities declared the creation of the Serbian Republic of Bosnia and Herzegovina, now called Republika Srpska ("Serb Republic", not to be confused with the Republic of Serbia) as a state within the country of Bosnia of Herzegovina. Republika Srpska now celebrates Republic Day on the anniversary of the state's creation.

26 January in India

The Constitution of India came into force, and India declared itself a Republic on 26 January 1950, a day thereafter celebrated annually as Republic Day in India. The Constitution had been drafted by the Constituent Assembly headed by Dr. B.R. Ambedkar which was set up when India gained its independence from the British in 1947. This, in fact, was a deliberate act: The 26 January was initially India's "Independence Day", one of Mahatma Gandhi's many symbolic acts during India's struggle for freedom against British colonial rule, and the adoption of the Constitution on this date was felt able to strengthen its initial meaning, one calling for Indians of all ages to declare their freedom from the British Raj by Mahatama Gandhi. It is one of three national holidays in India, the other two being the nation's Independence Day on 15 August (since 1947) and the birthday of Mohandas Karamchand Gandhi on 2 October. 

To mark this occasion, a grand parade is held near Kartavya path,formerly Rajpath in New Delhi, the capital of India, beginning from Raisina Hill near the Rashtrapati Bhavan (Presidential Palace), along the Kartavya path,formerly Rajpath ,past India Gate and on to the historic Red Fort in the old quarter of the city. Different infantry, cavalry and mechanized regiments of the Indian Army, the Indian Marines and the Indian Air Force march in formation, decked in all their finery and official decorations. The President of India, who is also the Commander in Chief of the Indian Armed Forces, takes the salute. The Chief Guest of the parade is the Head of State or Head of Government of another nation. The parade also includes many traditional dance troupes, to symbolize the cultural heritage of India. It traditionally ends with a colourful flypast by Indian Air Force jets in a tiranga formation. Similar parades are held in the capitals of all the states of India, where the Governors of the respective states take the salute. The official conclusion of republic day festivities is much later on 30 January, four days after the Republic day.

February

1 February in Hungary
On 1 February 1946 Hungary commemorates the proclamation of the Republic of Hungary. Since 2004, this day is a national commemoration day, without being a public or national Holiday.

March

23 March in Pakistan

In Pakistan this day marks the passing of the Lahore Resolution. Republic Day of Pakistan was first observed in 1956 when Pakistan officially became a Republic and shunned the former status of Dominion. The main events of this day include  a full military parade and the awarding of honours at the Presidency (Presidential Palace) by the President.
Every year, on 23 March, the Pakistani people commemorate their National Day in remembrance of "The Pakistan Resolution" passed on 23 March 1940, in the historic city of Lahore which is also the day the country was declared a republic.

May

28 May in Armenia and Nepal

On 28 May 1918 Armenia and Nepal Transcaucasian Democratic Federative Republic, thus forming the Democratic Republic of Armenia and the Nepal Democratic Republic. These were the first sovereign republics in the history of both countries and Nepal was the first democratic parliamentary republic only achieved consistency after the dissolution of the Soviet Union.

A decade-long People's Revolution by the Communist Party of Nepal (Maoist) along with several weeks of mass protests by all major political parties of Nepal in 2006, culminated in a peace accord and the ensuing elections for the constituent assembly voted overwhelmingly in favor of the abdication of the last Nepali monarch Gyanendra Shah and the establishment of a federal democratic republic on 28 May 2008.

31 May in South Africa (1961–1994)

Between 1961 and 1994, 31 May was celebrated in South Africa as Republic Day. This practice was discontinued in 1995 following the attainment of majority rule and the reorganisation of public holidays as a consequence. On the last Republic Day, in 1994, South Africa rejoined the Commonwealth of Nations.

June

2 June in Italy
The Festa della Repubblica is celebrated on the second day of June, and it commemorates the institutional referendum of 1946 when (by universal suffrage) the Italian population was called to decide what form of government (monarchy or republic) to give to the country after World War II and the fall of Fascism.

After 85 years of monarchy, with 12,717,923 votes for and 10,719,284 votes against, Italy became a Republic, and the monarchs of the House of Savoy were deposed and exiled. This is one of the most important Italian public holidays which, like 14 July in France and 4 July in the USA, celebrates the birth of the nation. A grand military parade is held in central Rome.

July

1 July in Ghana
Ghana's republican day.

14 July in Iraq
14 July 1958 is the day the Hashemite monarchy was overthrown in Iraq by popular forces led by Abdul Karim Kassem, who became the nation's new leader.  The event was commemorated in Baghdad with a statue in 14 July Square.

25 July in Tunisia
It's the day monarchy was abolished by the National Assembly and Republic was proclaimed. Habib Bourguiba was chosen to be the first President.

October

5 October in Portugal

5 October in Portugal is known as Implantação da República. It celebrates the proclamation of the Portuguese First Republic in 1910.

10 October in Republic of China

10 October in Taiwan is a national holiday commemorating the establishment of the Republic of China in 1911, the symbolic start of the Chinese revolution with the Wuchang uprising.  It is also known as the Double Ten Day.

24 October in Rhodesia (1970–1979)

Although the government of Ian Smith declared Rhodesia (now Zimbabwe) a republic on 2 March 1970, it was officially commemorated on 24 October. Following independence in 1980, the holiday was abolished.

25 October in Kazakhstan
In the waning days of Soviet rule, individual republics of the Soviet Union sought greater autonomy. The Soviet Union agreed in early 1990 to give up its monopoly of political power. Following the lead of Lithuanian SSR, Russian SFSR and others, Kazakh SSR declared its sovereignty on 25 October 1990, and Kazakhstan subsequently became independent on 16 December 1991 as the Soviet Union collapsed.  25 October, the anniversary of the adoption of the "Declaration on State Sovereignty of Kazakh SSR" by the Kazakh legislature in 1990, is now commemorated as Republic Day, a public holiday in Kazakhstan.

29 October in Turkey

On 29 October 1923, the Turkish constitution was amended and Turkey became a republic. This formally declared the dissolution of the Ottoman Empire. Republic Day (Turkish: Cumhuriyet Bayramı) is celebrated throughout Turkey and Northern Cyprus every year. Commemorative events usually begin in the afternoon on the previous day. In observance of the holiday, government offices and schools close for a day. Also, there are fireworks shows in all cities of Turkey.That day everyone commemorates Mustafa Kemal Atatürk.

November

11 November in the Maldives

On 11 November 1968, Maldives the then existing monarchy was abolished and replaced by a republic.

15 November in Brazil

On 15 November 1889, in the city of Rio de Janeiro (the Brazilian capital at that time), a military coup led by Field Marshal Deodoro da Fonseca overthrew Emperor Pedro II and declared Brazil a republic.

29 November in former Yugoslavia (1945–1990) 

On 29 November 1943 the Anti-Fascist Council of National Liberation of Yugoslavia (AVNOJ) established the foundations of post-war Yugoslavia as a socialist republic, which was officially proclaimed on the same date in 1945. Republic Day (local name: Dan Republike or Дан Републике) marked the occasion two consecutive days, 29 and 30 November, and was likely the most important holiday (the other two-day holidays were New Year and May Day).

In elementary schools first graders were inducted into the Union of Pioneers on or around Republic Day. Employees merged the holiday with weekends and extra days off to form 3-, 4- or even 5-day weekends.  Urban dwellers took the occasion to visit their relatives in the country, who marked the event with pig slaughter and the ensuing feast.

In 1980s, as central and Communist Party authority eroded, dissenters targeted Republic Day celebrations for criticism. In 1987 Bosnian garage rock band Zabranjeno pušenje published a song entitled Dan Republike, in which they criticized the state of the economy and protested the general indifference to the ideals behind the holiday. The band had to change some of the lyrics before being allowed to air the song.

In 1989, Slovenia and Croatia were the first federal republics to cease observing the holiday. Other seceded republics followed suit as Yugoslavia dissolved. Federal Republic of Yugoslavia kept the holiday until 2002.

The date "29.XI.1943" featured prominently on the Yugoslav coat of arms.

December

13 December in Malta

On 13 December 1974, the constitution of Malta was substantially revised, transforming the former British colony from a Commonwealth Realm into a republic within the Commonwealth. The British Monarch ceased to be recognised as Reġina ta' Malta (Queen of Malta) and the new Head of State was President Sir Anthony Mamo. This occasion is marked every year as Republic Day (Maltese: Jum ir-Repubblika) in Malta. The monument of Republic Day is at Marsa.

18 December in Niger
18 December 1958 is commemorated in the Republic of Niger as Republic Day, the national holiday.  Although not the date of formal, complete independence from France, 18 December marks the founding of the Republic and creation of the Presidency of the Republic of Niger, following the constitutional changes of the French Fifth Republic, and the elections of 4 December 1958 held across The French Colonial possessions. Nigeriens consider this date to be the founding of their nation. Between 18 December 1958 and 5 August 1964, Niger remained a semi-autonomous Republic within the French Community.

The 16th is celebrated in Niger with official festivals and appearances of political leaders, as well as public parties and festivities. The 50th anniversary celebrations were held in 2006, centered not in the capitol, but in the regional center of Tillabéry, and surrounded by sports, musical and arts competitions, the opening of new buildings, a National Youth Festival, and other public festivities.

Republic Day in other countries

 Albania: 11 January (1946)
 Armenia: 28 May (1918, see Democratic Republic of Armenia)
 Barbados: 30 November (2021)
 Burkina Faso: 11 December (1958, Upper Volta became an autonomous republic in the French Community.)
 Central African Republic: 1 December (1958, became an autonomous republic in the French Community.)
 East Germany: 7 October (1949, see Republic Day (East Germany))
 Gambia: 24 April (1970)
 Greece: 24 July (1974)
 Ghana: 1 July (1960)
 Guyana: 23 February (1970, also known as Mashramani)
 Iceland: 17 June (1944)
 India: 26 January (1950)
 Iran: 1 April (Islamic Republic Day)
 Iraq: 14 July
 Kenya: 12 December (1963, see Jamhuri Day.)
 Lithuania: 15 May (1920, known as the Constituent Assembly Day)
 Maldives: 11 November (1968)
 Nepal: 28 May (2008)
 Niger: 18 December (1958)
 North Korea: 9 September (1948)
 Pakistan: 23 March (1956)
Republic of the Congo: 28 November (1958)
 Sierra Leone: 27 April, (1961)
 Sri Lanka: 22 May, (1972)
 Tunisia: 25 July, (1957)
 Turkey: 29 October (1923)
 Trinidad and Tobago: 24 September (1976)

See also

 National Day
 Public holiday

Notes

References

National holidays